Killing Ground is the fifteenth full-length studio album by heavy metal band Saxon. Killing Ground was also released as a special Digi-pack edition with a bonus disc featuring 8 classic re-recorded tracks which would later appear in Heavy Metal Thunder.

Track listing

Personnel
 Biff Byford - vocals
 Paul Quinn - guitar
 Doug Scarratt - guitar
 Nibbs Carter - bass guitar
 Fritz Randow - drums

 Production
 Biff Byford – producer
 Saxon – producer
 Rainer Hänsel – executive producer
 KARO Studios, Brackel, Hamburg, Germany – recording location
 Nikolo Kotzev – audio engineer
 Charlie Bauerfeind – audio engineer 
 Herman Frank – mixing
 Rainer Hänsel – mixing
 Paul R. Gregory Studio 54 – artwork

Charts

References

Saxon (band) albums
2001 albums
SPV/Steamhammer albums